Aljoša Vučković (born 17 December 1946) is a retired Yugoslav actor. He appeared in more than one hundred films since 1967.

Biography
He is of Croat descent. Vučković has appeared in more than one hundred films since 1967.

Selected filmography

References

External links 

1946 births
Living people
Serbian male film actors
Croats of Serbia
People from Buzet
Male actors from Belgrade